Schori is a surname. Notable people with the surname include:

 Katharine Jefferts Schori (born 1954), US Episcopal bishop
 Pierre Schori (born 1938), Swedish diplomat and politician